Emma Eliza Coe (26 September 1850, in Apia – 1913, in Monte Carlo), known also as "Queen Emma of New Guinea", Emma Forsayth, Emma Farrell and Emma Kolbe was a business woman and plantation owner of mixed American/Samoan descent

Biography

Emma Coe was born in what is now American Samoa to Jonas Myndersse Coe, a US Commercial Representative, and Joana Talelatale, a Samoan belonging to the Malietoa dynasty. Her mother’s bloodline was related to the Moli tribe and Emma was recognized by the Malietoa as a princess. In 1869, she married James Forsayth, a Scottish seaman and they set up a shipping and trading business in American Samoa. Emma was involved in island politics with her father and lost favor with the local people after he was deported in 1876. Around this time, her husband was said to be lost at sea, but there was no confirmation that he was dead.

In 1878, she left American Samoa with an Australian lover, James Farrell, who was known as a blackbirder, captain and trader for the Duke of York Islands in between New Britain and New Ireland. There they traded mainly copra with the local population for beads, tobacco, knives and mirrors. At the time, the area was largely unsettled by Europeans due to resistance from the local inhabitants.

Emma and Farrell were to assist people who were involved in the Marquis De Rays incident when over 500 people were swindled out of their life’s savings to form a new colony at the South Eastern tip of New Ireland. Four ships sailed from France between Jan 1880 – Aug 1881, the Chandernagore, Genil, India and Neu Bretagne. This practically marooned the colonists whilst the founder reported the progress of the colony in an extremely positive light in his newspaper La Nouvelle France in Paris. Emma and Farrell assisted the marooned colonists in moving to Australia. De Rays was later tried and found guilty of fraud in France.

In 1881, Emma became interested in land around the Gazelle Peninsula of New Britain and differed with Farrell who continued trading. Emma bought the land from the local chiefs and with the assistance of her brother-in-law, Richard Parkinson, a Dane, set up a large coconut and cocoa plantations around Kokopo, East New Britain. During this period, she became highly successful and well respected. She was known as a heady woman, who used her charm on others and threw outlandish extravagant parties aided by her nieces. She was the envy of the German colonists who started to move into Kokopo around 1890 and passing trades ships. It was during this period she became affectionately known as the “Queen of New Guinea”.  Commercially from 1880–1900 years, her enterprises in Kokopo surpassed most in the region and the Pacific and she was most certainly the commerce queen of New Guinea.

In 1893 Emma married Paul Kolbe, a German colonial official and former army captain who was nearly fifteen years her junior. Her commercial empire was still in full swing when  she learnt of increasing tensions between Germany and Britain in the colonies and Europe towards the end of 1907. Emma sold off most of her assets in c. 1910 to Heinrich Rudolph Walen of Hamburgische Südsee AG.

Legacy
Forsayth is portrayed by Barbara Carrera in the 1988 television serial Emma: Queen of the South Seas, which was directed by John Banas for Australia's Network 10. She is featured in Christian Kracht's 2012 novel Imperium, which focuses on August Engelhardt.

References

Sources

1850 births
1913 deaths
American real estate businesspeople
American Samoan businesspeople
19th-century American businesswomen
19th-century American businesspeople